The San Zaccharia was a 64-gun ship of the line of the Navy of the Order of Saint John of Malta, later brought into French service as the Dégo.

Construction of San Zaccharia began in 1763 at Senglea Dockyard, Malta under the supervision of Master Shipwrights Agostino and Giuseppe Scolaro. She was launched two years later on 7 March 1765 and had been completed by 21 July 1765. She served with the Maltese Navy until the French invaded Malta on 11 June 1798, as part of the Mediterranean campaign of 1798. Her name was first gallicised into Zacharie, but she was promptly renamed Dégo upon request by Napoleon Bonaparte.

Dégo was blockaded in Valletta harbour during the Siege of Malta by the British, and was used as a prison hulk in Valletta harbour, being steadily stripped for firewood. She was eventually captured when the island surrendered on 4 September 1800, but the British considered her too worn out to take into service. She probably continued in use as a prison hulk, until she was sold for breaking up in 1803.

Sources and references 

Ships of the line of the French Navy
1765 ships
Ships built in Malta
Captured ships